Seán Mac Erlaine (born 30 July 1976) is an Irish musician and composer specialising in woodwinds and electronics. He studied jazz performance in Newpark Music Centre under Ronan Guilfoyle where he also taught for a number of years before completing his formal education at Dublin Institute of Technology where he was awarded a Masters in Jazz Performance as well as a PhD focusing on solo woodwind performance with live electronics.
He plays alto saxophone, clarinet and bass clarinet which he often processes through software created with Max/MSP. He has performed with leading musicians including Jan Bang, Bill Frisell, David Toop, Ernst Reijseger, The Smith Quartet, Hayden Chisholm, Eivind Aarset, Caoimhín Ó Raghallaigh, Ronan Guilfoyle, Iarla O'Lionaird, Valgeir Sigurðsson, Damo Suzuki and The Gloaming.
Mac Erlaine has released two solo albums on Irish record label Ergodos. The Irish Times describes Mac Erlaine as "consistently one of the most interesting and adventurous musicians of his generation."

Discography 
 Ordnance Survey: Relative Phase (Scintilla Recordings, 2019)
 INNI-K: The Hare & The Line (Independent, 2019)
 Achim Zepezauer + guests: Slotmachinene (Gruenrekorder, 2019)
 Seán Mac Erlaine: Music for Empty Ears (Ergodos, 2018)
 This is How we Fly: Foreign Fields (Playing With Music, 2017)
 Davy Kehoe: Short Passing Game (Wah Wah Wino, 2017)
 Benedict Schlepper-Connolly: The Weathered Stone (Ergodos, 2016)
 Dylan Tighe: Wabi-Sabi Soul (Independent, 2016)
 Quiet Music Ensemble: Mysteries Beyond Matter (Farpoint Recordings, 2015)
 Seán Mac Erlaine: A Slender Song (Ergodos, 2014)
 This is How we Fly: This is How we Fly (Playing With Music, 2014)
 Ergodos Musicians: Songs (Ergodos, 2014)
 Dylan Tighe: Record (Independent, 2014)
 Martin Tourish: Under a Red Sky Night (MT Music, 2014)
 Seán Mac Erlaine: Long After The Music Is Gone (Ergodos, 2012)

External links 

Official website - www.seanmacerlaine.com
Improvised Music Company artist page -

References

1976 births
Living people
Irish musicians
Experimental musicians